John Langdon (born August 24, 1947) is a former driver of standardbred racehorses in New Zealand. He was associated with many champions and was a leading driver of harness horses in New Zealand.

He is notable for winning the Inter Dominion Championship twice, both times in 1975. The Inter Dominion is the premier trotting series of races between Australia and New Zealand. He is also an inductee in the Inter Dominion Hall of Fame. Langdon also won the Auckland Trotting Cup and the New Zealand Trotting Cup. These are the two top races in New Zealand.

Big race wins
 1990 New Zealand Trotting Cup - Neroship
 1989 Auckland Trotting Cup - Neroship
 1987 Rowe Cup - Landora's Pride
 1984 Rowe Cup - Jenner
 1975 Inter Dominion Trotting Championship - Castleton's Pride
 1975 Inter Dominion Pacing Championship - Young Quinn

See also 
 Harness racing in New Zealand
 Inter Dominion Hall of Fame

References 

1947 births
Living people
New Zealand harness racers
Inter Dominion winners